Skeleton Creek is a stream in Logan, Kingfisher and Garfield counties, Oklahoma, in the United States.

Skeleton Creek was so named in 1867 by pioneers who found at the creek bones of Wichita Indians who had died during an outbreak of cholera.

See also
List of rivers of Oklahoma

References

Rivers of Garfield County, Oklahoma
Rivers of Logan County, Oklahoma
Rivers of Kingfisher County, Oklahoma
Rivers of Oklahoma